Poliocephalus and its counterparts poliocephala and poliocephalum are Greek words meaning 'grey-headed'. Poliocephalus is the name for a genus of grebes, while Poliocephala is the name for a genus of flies. The two words are often used as the second word of a binomial name. 

Species names poliocephalus or poliocephala could refer to any of the following:

Mammals

 the grey-headed flying-fox, Pteropus poliocephalus
 a tayra subspecies, Eira barbara poliocephala
 the white-headed langur, Trachypithecus poliocephalus

Birds

 the ashy-headed goose Chloephaga poliocephala
 the brown-chested alethe Pseudalethe poliocephala
 the gray-crowned palm-tanager Phaenicophilus poliocephalus
 the gray-crowned yellowthroat Geothlypis poliocephala
 the grey-crowned flatbill Tolmomyias poliocephalus
 the grey-headed babbler Stachyris poliocephala
 the grey-headed greenbul Phyllastrephus poliocephalus
 the grey-headed swamphen Porphyrio (porphyrio) poliocephalus
 the hoary-headed grebe Poliocephalus poliocephalus
 the island thrush Turdus poliocephalus
 the lesser cuckoo Cuculus poliocephalus
 a little tinamou subspecies Crypturellus soui poliocephalus
 the mountain nightjar, Caprimulgus poliocephalus
 the New Guinea goshawk Accipiter poliocephalus
 the pink-bellied imperial pigeon Ducula poliocephala
 the west Mexican chachalaca Ortalis poliocephala
 the yellow-lored tody-flycatcher Todirostrum poliocephalum

Insects

 the moth Acrocercops poliocephala
 the fly Trentepohlia poliocephala